In mathematics, an analytic function is a function that is locally given by a convergent power series. There exist both real analytic functions and complex analytic functions. Functions of each type are infinitely differentiable, but complex analytic functions exhibit properties that do not generally hold for real analytic functions. A function is analytic if and only if its Taylor series about x0 converges to the function in some neighborhood for every x0 in its domain.

Definitions 

Formally, a function  is real analytic on an open set  in the real line if for any  one  can write

Alternatively, a real analytic function is an infinitely differentiable function such that the Taylor series at any point  in its domain

The definition of a complex analytic function is obtained by replacing, in the definitions above, "real" with "complex" and "real line" with "complex plane". A function is complex analytic if and only if it is holomorphic i.e. it is complex differentiable. For this reason the terms "holomorphic" and "analytic" are often used interchangeably for such functions.

Examples 
Typical examples of analytic functions are
 All elementary functions:
 All polynomials: if a polynomial has degree n, any terms of degree larger than n in its Taylor series expansion must immediately vanish to 0, and so this series will be trivially convergent. Furthermore, every polynomial is its own Maclaurin series.
 The exponential function is analytic. Any Taylor series for this function converges not only for x close enough to x0 (as in the definition) but for all values of x (real or complex).
 The trigonometric functions, logarithm, and the power functions are analytic on any open set of their domain.
 Most special functions (at least in some range of the complex plane):
 hypergeometric functions
 Bessel functions
 gamma functions

Typical examples of functions that are not analytic are

 The absolute value function when defined on the set of real numbers or complex numbers is not everywhere analytic because it is not differentiable at 0.
 Piecewise defined functions (functions given by different formulae in different regions) are typically not analytic where the pieces meet.
 Other non-analytic smooth functions, and in particular any smooth function  with compact support, i.e.

Alternative characterizations

The following conditions are equivalent:

 is real analytic on an open set .
 is smooth and for every compact set  there exists a constant  such that for every  and every non-negative integer  the following bound holds 

Complex analytic functions are exactly equivalent to holomorphic functions, and are thus much more easily characterized.

For the case of an analytic function with several variables (see below),  the real analyticity can be characterized using the Fourier–Bros–Iagolnitzer transform. 

In the multivariable case, real analytic functions satisfy a direct generalization of the third characterization. Let  be an open set, and let . 

Then  is real analytic on  if and only if  and for every compact  there exists a constant  such that for every multi-index  the following bound holds

Properties of analytic functions
 The sums, products, and compositions of analytic functions are analytic.
 The reciprocal of an analytic function that is nowhere zero is analytic, as is the inverse of an invertible analytic function whose derivative is nowhere zero. (See also the Lagrange inversion theorem.)
 Any analytic function is smooth, that is, infinitely differentiable. The converse is not true for real functions; in fact, in a certain sense, the real analytic functions are sparse compared to all real infinitely differentiable functions. For the complex numbers, the converse does hold, and in fact any function differentiable once on an open set is analytic on that set (see "analyticity and differentiability" below).
 For any open set , the set A(Ω) of all  analytic functions  is a Fréchet space with respect to the uniform convergence on compact sets. The fact that uniform limits on compact sets of analytic functions are analytic is an easy consequence of Morera's theorem. The set  of all bounded analytic functions with the supremum norm is a Banach space.

A polynomial cannot be zero at too many points unless it is the zero polynomial (more precisely, the number of zeros is at most the degree of the polynomial). A similar but weaker statement holds for analytic functions. If the set of zeros of an analytic function ƒ has an accumulation point inside its domain, then ƒ is zero everywhere on the connected component containing the accumulation point. In other words, if (rn) is a sequence of distinct numbers such that ƒ(rn) = 0 for all n and this sequence converges to a point r in the domain of D, then ƒ is identically zero on the connected component of D  containing r. This is known as the identity theorem.

Also, if all the derivatives of an analytic function at a point are zero, the function is constant on the corresponding connected component.

These statements imply that while analytic functions do have more degrees of freedom than polynomials, they are still quite rigid.

Analyticity and differentiability
As noted above, any analytic function (real or complex) is infinitely differentiable (also known as smooth, or ). (Note that this differentiability is in the sense of real variables; compare complex derivatives below.) There exist smooth real functions that are not analytic: see non-analytic smooth function. In fact there are many such functions.

The situation is quite different when one considers complex analytic functions and complex derivatives. It can be proved that any complex function differentiable (in the complex sense) in an open set is analytic. Consequently, in complex analysis, the term analytic function is synonymous with holomorphic function.

Real versus complex analytic functions
Real and complex analytic functions have important differences (one could notice that even from their different relationship with differentiability). Analyticity of complex functions is a more restrictive property, as it has more restrictive necessary conditions and complex analytic functions have more structure than their real-line counterparts.

According to Liouville's theorem, any bounded complex analytic function defined on the whole complex plane is constant. The corresponding statement for real analytic functions, with the complex plane replaced by the real line, is clearly false; this is illustrated by

Also, if a complex analytic function is defined in an open ball around a point x0, its power series expansion at x0 is convergent in the whole open ball (holomorphic functions are analytic). This statement for real analytic functions (with open ball meaning an open interval of the real line rather than an open disk of the complex plane) is not true in general; the function of the example above gives an example for x0 = 0 and a ball of radius exceeding 1, since the power series  diverges for |x| ≥ 1.

Any real analytic function on some open set on the real line can be extended to a complex analytic function on some open set of the complex plane. However, not every real analytic function defined on the whole real line can be extended to a complex function defined on the whole complex plane. The function ƒ(x) defined in the paragraph above is a counterexample, as it is not defined for x = ±i. This explains why the Taylor series of ƒ(x) diverges for |x| > 1, i.e., the radius of convergence is 1 because the complexified function has a pole at distance 1 from the evaluation point 0 and no further poles within the open disc of radius 1 around the evaluation point.

Analytic functions of several variables
One can define analytic functions in several variables by means of power series in those variables (see power series). Analytic functions of several variables have some of the same properties as analytic functions of one variable. However, especially for complex analytic functions, new and interesting phenomena show up in 2 or more complex dimensions:

 Zero sets of complex analytic functions in more than one variable are never discrete. This can be proved by Hartogs's extension theorem.
 Domains of holomorphy for single-valued functions consist of arbitrary (connected) open sets. In several complex variables, however, only some connected open sets are domains of holomorphy. The characterization of domains of holomorphy leads to the notion of pseudoconvexity.

See also
Cauchy–Riemann equations
Holomorphic function
Paley–Wiener theorem
Quasi-analytic function
Infinite compositions of analytic functions

Notes

References

External links
 
 
 Solver for all zeros of a complex analytic function that lie within a rectangular region by Ivan B. Ivanov